Rosedale is a city in Bolivar County, Mississippi, United States.  The population was 1,873 at the 2010 census, down from 2,414 in 2000. Located in an agricultural area, the city had a stop on the Yazoo and Mississippi Valley Railroad, which carried many migrants north out of the area in the first half of the 20th century.

History

Rosedale was settled around 1838 and became one of the two county seats in 1872.   This area was developed by European American planters for extensive cotton plantations, dependent on enslaved laborers. After the Civil War and emancipation, some freedmen managed to clear and buy land in the bottomlands, with many becoming landowners before the end of the nineteenth century. By 1910, a lengthy recession and declining economic and political conditions resulted in most blacks in the state losing their land. They could not compete with the financing gained by railroads, which were constructed in the area beginning in 1882 Many stayed in the area to work as sharecroppers and laborers. The railroad brought new business to Rosedale, which had a depot and shipped cotton to northern and other markets. Rosedale incorporated as a town February 2, 1882 and became a city in 1930. 

Beginning in the early twentieth century, tens of thousands of blacks left the state of Mississippi as part of the Great Migration, north by railroad to Chicago and other Midwestern industrial cities. During and after World War II, others went to California to work in the defense industry. Others remained where their families had lived for generations, with strong local ties.

In 2007, the Mississippi Blues Commission placed a historic marker at Rosedale's former Yazoo and Mississippi Valley Railroad depot site, designating it as a site on the Mississippi Blues Trail. The marker commemorates the sites in the original lyrics of legendary blues artist Robert Johnson's song "Travelling Riverside Blues". He traced the railway route which ran south from Friars Point to Rosedale among other stops, including Vicksburg and north to Memphis. The marker emphasizes that a common theme of blues songs was riding on the railroad, which was seen as a metaphor for travel and escape from poverty and Jim Crow in the Delta. It also commemorates another common blues theme, life on the banks of a moody river bank, a theme heard in Charlie Patton's "High Water Everywhere".

Locals claim that Johnson sold his soul to the Devil at the intersection of Mississippi state highways 1 and 8, on the south end of town, and that he tells this story metaphorically in "Cross Road Blues." Other artists have referred to his songs. Johnson's deal with the Devil is mentioned as occurring in Rosedale in 1930 in an episode of the TV series Supernatural. However, a number of other Delta municipalities claim that the transaction took place in or near their boundaries.

Geography

Rosedale is situated on the eastern side of the Mississippi River, approximately midway between the mouths of the Arkansas and White rivers, which flow into the Mississippi from the Arkansas (western) side.

Demographics

2020 census

As of the 2020 United States Census, there were 1,584 people, 642 households, and 398 families residing in the city.

2000 census
As of the census of 2000, there were 2,414 people, 780 households, and 567 families residing in the city. The population density was 444.2 people per square mile (171.6/km). There were 842 housing units at an average density of 154.9 per square mile (59.9/km). The racial makeup of the city was 16.86% White, 82.02% African American, 0.37% Asian, 0.17% from other races, and 0.58% from two or more races. Hispanic or Latino of any race were 0.75% of the population.

There were 780 households, out of which 38.1% had children under the age of 18 living with them, 29.2% were married couples living together, 37.8% had a female householder with no husband present, and 27.3% were non-families. 24.5% of all households were made up of individuals, and 11.4% had someone living alone who was 65 years of age or older. The average household size was 2.99 and the average family size was 3.56.

In the city, the population was spread out, with 34.9% under the age of 18, 10.4% from 18 to 24, 27.2% from 25 to 44, 17.6% from 45 to 64, and 9.9% who were 65 years of age or older. The median age was 28 years. For every 100 females, there were 85.3 males. For every 100 females age 18 and over, there were 78.3 males.

The median income for a household in the city was $17,955, and the median income for a family was $18,810. Males had a median income of $24,922 versus $15,714 for females. The per capita income for the city was $8,534. About 43.3% of families and 46.0% of the population were below the poverty line, including 58.6% of those under age 18 and 34.6% of those age 65 or over.

In 2010, Rosedale had the 22nd-lowest median household income of all places in the United States with a population over 1,000.

Education
Rosedale is served by the West Bolivar Consolidated School District (formerly West Bolivar School District). Children in Rosedale are assigned to West Bolivar Elementary School, West Bolivar Middle School, and West Bolivar High School.

The case of Gong Lum v. Rice, wherein the U.S. Supreme Court held that a Chinese student was ineligible to attend the school for white children, and instead, was required to attend the school for colored children, originated in Rosedale.

Notable people
 Travarus Bennett, former professional basketball player
 Dennis Binder, rhythm & blues musician and singer
Joseph Henry Bufford, state legislator
 Redd Holt, jazz and soul music drummer
 Percy Malone, Arkansas politician and pharmacist
 Cliff Meely, professional basketball player
 Walter Sillers, lawyer and planter
 Walter Sillers, Jr., segregationist, lawyer and legislative leader
 Florence Sillers Ogden, columnist and segregationist
 Florence Warfield Sillers, historian and socialite

References

External links

 
Cities in Mississippi
Mississippi populated places on the Mississippi River
Cities in Bolivar County, Mississippi
County seats in Mississippi
Mississippi Blues Trail